List of hospitals in Greenland include the following:
Queen Ingrid's Hospital, Nuuk, 130 beds
Aasiaat Regional Hospital, Aasiaat 
Ilulissat Regional Hospital, Ilulissat 
Sisimiut Regional Hospital, Sisimiut 
Qaqortoq Regional Hospital, Qaqortoq 
National Hospital: Dronning Ingrid Hospital, Nuuk

See also
Health in Greenland

References

Hospitals in Greenland
Hospitals
Greenland